SD Croatia Berlin is a German football club from Berlin.

History
The club was founded in 1972 as the ethnically Croatian side NK Croatia Berlin and was renamed NK Hajduk Berlin in 1985. The association continued to grow through the late 1980s, merging with SC Bratstvo 1971 Berlin to become SC Bratstvo-Hajduk Berlin in 1987. The following year a number of smaller clubs (NK Livno, NK Velebit, NK Dinamo) came into the fold until finally a 14 January 1989 merger with SV Croatia 1987 Berlin spawned the present-day club.

SD Croatia Berlin became the first Croatian club in Germany to reach third tier competition when it was promoted to the Regionalliga Nordost after their 1998 Oberliga Nordost, Staffel Nord (IV) championship. SD Croatia Berlin spent only a single season at that level before suffering a series of relegations. They slipped to the Verbandsliga Berlin (V) in 2001, through the Landesliga Berlin (VI) in 2003, to the Bezirksliga Berlin (VII). In 2005 it rose back to the Landesliga, the seventh level since 2008, and returned to the Bezirksliga in 2010. Three successive promotions after three years in the Bezirksliga put them back in the Berlin-Liga (VI).

SD Croatia Berlin competed in the Croatian World Club Championship in 2007.

Honours
The club's honours:

Football
 NOFV-Oberliga Nord
 Champions: 1998
 Verbandsliga Berlin
 Champions: 1996
 Berliner Landespokal
 Runners-up: 1994
 Landesliga Berlin Staffel 2
 Champions: 2015
 Bezirksliga Berlin Staffel 1
 Champions: 2013

Other departments
SD Croatia Berlin has its futsal team. It participated in both the domestic and continental competitions.

Futsal honours
 DFB Futsal Cup
 Winners: 2010, 2011

UEFA club competitions record

External links
 Official website 
 The Abseits Guide to German Soccer
 Croatia Berlin History at Nogometni Magazin 

Football clubs in Germany
Croatia
Association football clubs established in 1972
Croatian sports clubs outside Croatia
Futsal clubs in Germany
1972 establishments in Germany
Migrant workers football clubs in Germany